Homosexuality in India has been a subject of discussion from ancient times to modern times. Hindu texts have taken various positions regarding homosexual characters and themes. The ancient Indian text Kamasutra written by Vātsyāyana dedicates a complete chapter on erotic homosexual behaviour. Historical literary evidence indicates that homosexuality has been prevalent across the Indian subcontinent throughout history, and that homosexuals were not necessarily considered inferior in any way until about 18th century during British colonial rule.

However, previously under the Islamic law of Fatawa-e-Alamgiri, the Mughal Empire mandated a common set of punishments for homosexuality, which could include 50 lashes for a slave, 100 for a free infidel, or death by stoning for a Muslim. 

On 7 September 2018, a 5-judge constitutional bench of Supreme Court of India invalidated part of Section 377 of the Indian Penal Code, hence making homosexuality legal in India. In striking down the colonial-era law that made gay sex punishable by up to 10 years in prison, one judge said the landmark decision would "pave the way for a better future." This ruling also applied to Jammu and Kashmir state under Article 141 of the Constitution of India and Delhi Agreement 1952, as section 377 of IPC and Ranbir Penal Code is prima materia and Judicial Pronouncements were extended to Jammu and Kashmir.

There are no official demographics for the LGBT population in India, but the government of India submitted figures to the Supreme Court in 2012, according to which, there were about 2.5 million gay people recorded in India. These figures are only based on those individuals who have self-declared to the Ministry of Health and Family Welfare. There may be much higher statistics for individuals who have concealed their identity, since a number of LGBTQ Indians are living in the closet due to fear of discrimination.

Homophobia is prevalent in India. Public discussion of homosexuality in India has been inhibited by the fact that sexuality in any form is rarely discussed openly. In recent years, however, attitudes towards homosexuality have shifted slightly. In particular, there have been more depictions and discussions of homosexuality in the Indian media and cinema. Before striking down the colonial-era law several organisations have expressed support for decriminalising homosexuality in India, and pushed for tolerance and social equality for lesbian, gay, bisexual, transgender, queer people, and others with marginalised identities traditional to India. India is among countries with a social element of a third gender. Mental, physical, emotional and economic violence against the LGBT community in India continues to be a problem. Lacking support from family, society or police, many gay rape victims do not report the crimes.

Multinational research firm Ipsos released report on LGBT+ Pride 2021 Global Survey conducted between 23 April and 7 May 2021. The survey was conducted as a 27 market survey conducted by Ipsos on its global advisor platform through interview on a sample of 500 individuals in India. The report shows that 3% of the Indian Population identify as homosexual (Including Gay and Lesbian), 9% identify as bisexual, 1% identify as pansexual and 2% identify as asexual. Totally, 17% identify as not heterosexual (excluding 'do not know', and 'prefer not to answer').

History

There are ancient Indian texts which are relevant to modern LGBT causes. Religion has played a role in shaping Indian customs and traditions. While injunctions on homosexuality's morality are not explicitly mentioned in the religious texts central to Hinduism (the largest religion in India) it has taken various positions, ranging from homosexual characters and themes in its texts to being neutral or antagonistic towards it.

The Baudhāyana Dharmasūtra (3.7.2) says about ejaculation, "A man who ejaculates his semen in any place other than the vagina becomes equal to a thief, equal to a murderer of a Brahmin." For purification, the man should "get the hair of his head, beard, and body shaved and his nails clipped on a new-moon or a full-moon day" and observe a vow "for a year, for a month, or for twenty-four, twelve, six, or three days" not to "eat meat, engage in sex, or sit on anything above the floor, and recoil from uttering an untruth" .

The ancient Indian text Kamasutra written by Vātsyāyana dedicates a complete chapter on erotic homosexual behaviour. Historical literary evidence indicates that homosexuality has been prevalent across the Indian subcontinent throughout history.

The Arthashastra, an ancient Indian treatise on statecraft, mentions a wide variety of sexual practices which, whether performed with a man or a woman, were sought to be punished with the lowest grade of fine. While homosexual intercourse was not sanctioned, it was treated as a very minor offence, and several kinds of heterosexual intercourse were punished more severely.

Sex between non-virgin women incurred a small fine, while homosexual intercourse between men could be made up for merely with a bath with one's clothes on, and a penance of "eating the five products of the cow and keeping a one-night fast". Devdutt Pattanaik summarises the place of homosexuality in Hindu literature as follows: "though not part of the mainstream, its existence was acknowledged but not approved."

The biography of Sarmad Kashani published by caretakers of his shrine states that he had fallen for a Hindu boy named Abhai Chand whose father eventually relented and allowed them to be together.

The Fatawa-e-Alamgiri of the Mughal Empire mandated a common set of punishments for homosexuality, which could include 50 lashes for a slave, 100 for a free infidel, or death by stoning for a Muslim.

Legal status

On 24 August 2017, India's Supreme Court gave the country's LGBT community the freedom to safely express their sexual orientation. Therefore, an individual's sexual orientation is protected under the country's Right to Privacy law. However, the Supreme Court did not directly overturn any laws criminalising same-sex relationships.

On 6 September 2018, consensual gay sex was legalised by India's Supreme Court.

Section 377 of the Indian Penal Code (IPC), dating back to 1861, makes sexual activities "against the order of nature" punishable by law and carries a life sentence. The law replaced the variety of punishments for Zina (unlawful intercourse) mandated in the Mughal empire's Fatawa-e-Alamgiri, these ranged from 50 lashes for a slave, 100 for a free infidel, to death by stoning for a Muslim. Similarly the Goa Inquisition once prosecuted the capital crime of sodomy in Portuguese India, but not lesbian acts.

Support for decriminalisation

One leader, Akkai Padmashali was influential in the protests and demonstrations that eventually led to the repeal of Section 377 of Indian Penal Code. She started the organisation "Ondede" in 2014 which envisioned a society that is non-discriminatory and gender-just. Ondede, in Kannada, means convergence and this is what she envisioned for the society of India as a whole. She wanted Ondede to be a place where people of all sexual orientations spoke openly of their concerns. Their mission statement is "To create a space for dialogue, support and strengthen action to visibilize issues of Dignity-Voice- Sexuality in relation to children, women ,and sexual minorities". They develop partnerships with community groups through social movements, engage with the state and conduct research.

Several organisations, including the Naz Foundation (India) Trust, the National AIDS Control Organisation, Law Commission of India, Union Health Ministry, National Human Rights Commission of India and the Planning Commission of India have expressed support for decriminalizing homosexuality in India.

In September 2006, Nobel Laureate Amartya Sen, acclaimed writer Vikram Seth and other prominent Indians publicly demanded the repeal of section 377 of the IPC. The open letter demanded that "In the name of humanity and of our Constitution, this cruel and discriminatory law should be struck down." On 30 June 2008, Indian Labour Minister Oscar Fernandes backed calls for decriminalisation of consensual gay sex, and Prime Minister Manmohan Singh called for greater tolerance towards homosexuals. On 23 July 2008, Bombay High Court Judge Bilal Nazki said that India's unnatural sex law should be reviewed. The Law Commission of India had historically favoured the retention of this section in its 42nd and 156th report, but in its 172nd report, delivered in 2000, it recommended its repeal.

On 9 August 2008, then health minister, Anbumani Ramadoss began his campaign for changing Section 377 of the Indian penal code, which defines homosexuality as an unnatural act and thus illegal. At the International AIDS Conference in Mexico City, he said, "Section 377 of IPC, which criminalises men who have sex with men, must go." His ministerial portfolio had put him at odds with the Indian Home Minister Shivraj Patil and several other ministers in seeking to scrap Section 377. In late 2008, he changed his argument saying he does not want the scrapping of Section 377 but a mere modification of the law treating homosexuality as a criminal offence punishable up to life imprisonment. He said he wants Prime Minister Manmohan Singh to resolve the matter, while he wanted to avoid discord with the home ministry, who said the altered law would then result in an increase in criminal incidences of sodomy or offences involving sexual abuse of children, particularly boys. In doing so he alleged that the law even penalises health workers who treat homosexuals, while making this a cognisable and non-bailable offence.

Various Hindu organisations, based in India and abroad have supported decriminalisation of homosexual behaviours. In 2009, the Hindu Council UK became one of the first major religious organisations to support LGBT rights when they issued a statement "Hinduism does not condemn homosexuality". Sri Sri Ravi Shankar, a prominent Hindu spiritual leader, has condemned sec 377 in a series of tweets, maintaining that "Hinduism has never considered homosexuality a crime" and "to brand a person a criminal based on sexual preference would be absurd".

The United Nations has urged India to decriminalise homosexuality by saying it would help the fight against HIV/AIDS by allowing intervention programmes, much like the successful ones in China and Brazil. Jeffrey O'Malley, director of the United Nations Development Programme (UNDP) on HIV/AIDS, has stated countries which protect men who have sex with men (MSM) have double the rate of coverage of HIV prevention services as much as 60%. According to him, inappropriate criminalisation hinders universal access to essential HIV, health and social services. Later talking to The Hindu in November 2008, he added concerns that the then in power United Progressive Alliance government was in a difficult position in regards to amending Section 377 of the Indian Penal Code because of the then upcoming elections, as such changes could be misrepresented. He further emphasised the need to change the laws, sensitise the police and judiciary. According to him, after removal of discriminatory laws, marginalised groups would have better access to treatment and prevention facilities like condoms. He warned of the urgency and stated that India had succeeded in checking the spread of AIDS through commercial sex workers but transmission through gay sex, and injectable-drug users was still an area of concern in the country.

In July 2014, a book on LGBTQIA and genderqueer rights published by Srishti Madurai was released by Vanathi Srinivasan, the general secretary of the BJP in Tamil Nadu. The move has been considered encouraging by members of the LGBTQIA community.

Bharatiya Janata Party senior leader Arun Jaitley stated in February 2014 that he supported decriminalisation of homosexuality. On 13 January 2015, BJP spokesperson Shaina NC, appearing on NDTV, stated, "We BJP are for decriminalising homosexuality. That is the progressive way forward." However, the BJP government (at that time the ruling party at the Union of India) did not put forth any stand before the Supreme Court when the Navtej Johar case (which decriminalised homosexuality) was being decided and left the matter to the 'wisdom of the court'.

Rashtriya Swayamsevak Sangh spokesperson Ram Madhav in an interview with national daily Business Standard said in May 2014: "But I can say this – that while glorification of certain forms of social behaviour is not something we endorse, the penalising and criminalisation aspects need to be looked into. Whether to call homosexuality a crime and treat it as one in this day and age is questionable." This is interpreted as Sangh's support to decriminalisation of homosexuality.

On 6 March 2016, Srishti Madurai's new website was launched by Dalit activist and Ambedkarite Ma.Venkatesan from BJP in the presence of Central Minister Pon Radhakrishnan, Vanathi Srinivasan, Aravindan Neelakandan, Joe D'Cruz and scores of Rashtriya Swayamsevak Sangh volunteers at Chennai.

Court proceedings and recent political legislation
In December 2002, Naz Foundation filed a Public Interest Litigation (PIL) to challenge IPC Section 377 in the Delhi High Court. On 4 July 2008, the Delhi High Court noted that there was "nothing unusual" in holding a gay rally, something which is common outside India.

On 2 July 2009, in the case of Naz Foundation v National Capital Territory of Delhi, the High Court of Delhi struck down much of S. 377 of the IPC as being unconstitutional. The Court held that to the extent S. 377 criminalised consensual non-vaginal sexual acts between adults, it violated an individual's fundamental rights to equality before the law, freedom from discrimination and to life and personal liberty under Articles 14, 15 and 21 of the Constitution of India. The High Court did not strike down Section 377 completely. It held the section to be valid in case of non-consensual non-vaginal intercourse or to intercourse with minors, and it expressed the hope that Parliament would legislatively address the issue.

On 11 December 2013, on responding an appeal filed by an astrologer Suresh Kumar Koushal and others, the Supreme Court of India upheld the constitutionality of Section 377 of the IPC, and stated that the Court was instead deferring to Indian legislators to provide the sought-after clarity. The Delhi High Court judgement was as follows:

On 28 January 2014, Supreme Court dismissed the review petition filed by Central Government, Naz Foundation and several others, against its 11 December verdict on Section 377 of IPC.

In January 2015, National Crime Records Bureau (NCRB) said that according to data collected, 778 cases were filed under Section 377 of IPC and 587 arrests were made in 2014 until October after the Supreme Court verdict. Some states are yet to submit their full data.

On 18 December 2015 Shashi Tharoor, a member of the Indian National Congress, introduced a Private Members Bill for the decriminalisation of Section 377 of the Indian Penal Code in the Lok Sabha, but the motion was rejected by house by a vote of 71–24 with one abstention.

On 12 March 2016, Tharoor once again introduced a Private Members Bill for the decriminilsation of Section 377. However, the motion for introduction was yet again defeated by a division of 58–14 with one abstention.

On 2 February 2016, the Supreme Court agreed to reconsider its 2013 judgment; it said it would refer petitions to abolish Section 377 to a five-member constitutional bench, which would conduct a comprehensive hearing of the issue.

On 24 August 2016 a draft law for the ban of commercial surrogacy was cleared by the Union Cabinet and announced by Sushma Swaraj, the Minister of External Affairs (India). The draft bill denied homosexuals the right to have surrogate children, with Swaraj stating "We do not recognise live-in and homosexual relationships ... this is against our ethos".

On 24 August 2017, the Supreme Court upheld that the right to individual privacy is an "intrinsic" and fundamental right under the constitution. In its 547-page decision on privacy rights, the nine-judge bench also held that "sexual orientation is an essential attribute of privacy". The judgement noted, "Discrimination against an individual on the basis of sexual orientation is deeply offensive to the dignity and self-worth of the individual. Equality demands that the sexual orientation of each individual in society must be protected on an even platform. The right to privacy and the protection of sexual orientation lie at the core of the fundamental rights guaranteed by Articles 14, 15 and 21 of the Constitution."

On 10 July 2018, the Supreme Court upheld the importance of the rights of the LGBT community. Justice D. Y. Chandrachud, in the proceedings of the court, held that choosing a partner was every person's fundamental right.

On 6 September 2018, the Supreme Court struck down the part of section 377, a British-era provision, criminalising consensual homosexual activities. The court upheld that other aspects of section 377 criminalising unnatural sex with minors and animals will remain in force.

Recognition of same-sex couples

In February 2017, the Ministry of Health and Family Welfare unveiled resource material relating to health issues to be used as a part of a nationwide adolescent peer-education plan called Saathiya. Among other subjects, the material discusses homosexuality. The material states, "Yes, adolescents frequently fall in love. They can feel attraction for a friend or any individual of the same or opposite sex. It is normal to have special feelings for someone. It is important for adolescents to understand that such relationships are based on mutual consent, trust, transparency, and respect. It is alright to talk about such feelings to the person for whom you have them but always in a respectful manner."

Conversion therapy 
In February 2014, the Indian Psychiatric Society (IPS) issued a statement in which it stated that there is no evidence to prove that homosexuality is unnatural: "Based on existing scientific evidence and good practice guidelines from the field of psychiatry, the Indian Psychiatric Society would like to state that there is no evidence to substantiate the belief that homosexuality is a mental illness or a disease." In June 2018, IPS reiterated its stance on homosexuality saying: "Certain people are not cut out to be heterosexual and we don't need to castigate them, we don't need to punish them, to ostracize them".

Despite this statement from the IPS, conversion therapies are still performed in India. These practices usually involve electroconvulsive therapy (which may lead to memory loss), hypnosis, the administration of nausea-inducing drugs, or more commonly talk therapy where the individual is told that homosexuality is caused by "insufficient male affirmation in childhood" or "an uncaring father and an overbearing mother". Conversion therapy can lead to depression, anxiety, seizures, drug use and suicidal tendencies for the individuals involved.

S Sushma v. Commissioner of Police 
On 28 April 2021 Madras High Court Justice N Anand Venkatesh passed an interim orders in response to a petition filed by two young women with same sex orientation. According to the order, in an unprecedented move, he decided to undergo psycho-education before penning a judgment on same sex relationships.

Justice N Anand Venkatesh said that psyhco-educative counseling on queer issues helped him shed his personal ignorance and prejudices. He clearly stated in the judgment that the responsibility to change, the burden of unlearning stigma, and learning about the lived experience of the queer community lies on the society and not the queer individuals.

The court recognized that there's an absence of a specific law to protect the interests of queer people and acknowledged it is the responsibility of the constitutional courts to fill this vacuum with necessary directions to ensure the protection of such couples from harassment sourced from stigma and prejudices.

On 7 June 2021, in delivering the verdict on this case, Justice N Anand Venkatesh prohibited Conversion Therapy in Tamil Nadu and Puducherry. He suggested comprehensive measures to sensitise the society and various branches of the State including the Police and judiciary to remove prejudices against the LGBTQIA+ community. He suggested that changes be made to the curricula of schools and universities to educate students on understanding the LGBTQIA+ community.

Religious opposition
The 11 December 2013 judgment of the Supreme Court, upholding Section 377, was met with support from religious leaders. The main petitioner in the plea was an astrologer, Suresh Kumar Koushal, and other petitioners were religious organisations like All India Muslim Personal Law Board, Trust God Missionaries, Krantikari Manuwadi Morcha, Apostolic Churches Alliance, and Utkal Christian Council. The Daily News and Analysis called it "the univocal unity of religious leaders in expressing their homophobic attitude. Usually divisive and almost always seen tearing down each other's religious beliefs, leaders across sections came forward in decrying homosexuality and expressing their solidarity with the judgment." The article added that Baba Ramdev India's well-known yoga guru, after advising that journalists interviewing him not to turn homosexual, stated he could cure homosexuality through yoga and called it a bad addiction.

The Vishwa Hindu Parishad's vice-president Om Prakash Singhal said, "This is a right decision, we welcome it. Homosexuality is against Indian culture, against nature, and against science. We are regressing, going back to when we were almost like animals. The SC had protected our culture." Singhal further dismissed HIV/AIDS concerns within the LGBT community saying, "It is understood that when you try to suppress one anomaly, there will be a break-out of a few more."

Maulana Madni, of an Islamic organisation, Jamiat Ulema-e-Hind, has echoed similar sentiments by stating that "Homosexuality is a crime according to scriptures and is unnatural. People cannot consider themselves to be exclusive of a society... In a society, a family is made up of a man and a woman, not a woman and a woman, or a man and a man. If these same-sex couples adopt children, the child will grow up with a skewed version of a family. Society will disintegrate. If we are to look at countries in the West who have allowed same-sex marriages, you will find the mental tensions they suffer from."

Rabbi Ezekiel Isaac Malekar, honorary secretary of the Judah Hyam Synagogue, in upholding the judgement, was also quoted as saying "In Judaism, our scriptures do not permit homosexuality." Reverend Paul Swarup of the Cathedral Church of the Redemption in Delhi in stating his views on what he believes to be the unnaturalness of homosexuality, stated "Spiritually, human sexual relations are identified as those shared by a man and a woman. The Supreme Court's view is an endorsement of our scriptures."

Pride parades
In 2005, Prince Manvendra Singh Gohil, who hails from Manimala in Kerala, publicly came out as gay. He was disinherited as an immediate reaction by the royal family, though they eventually reconciled. He appeared on the American talk show The Oprah Winfrey Show on 24 October 2007, and on BBC Three's Undercover Princes. In 2008, Zoltan Parag, a competitor at the Mr. Gay International contest, said that he was apprehensive about returning to India. He said, "Indian media has exposed me so much that now when I call my friends back home, their parents do not let them talk to me".

On 29 June 2008, five Indian cities (Delhi, Bangalore, Kolkata, Indore and Pondicherry) celebrated gay pride parades. About 2,000 people turned out in these nationwide parades. Mumbai held its pride march on 16 August 2008, with Bollywood actress Celina Jaitley flagged off the festivities. On 4 July 2008, the Delhi High Court, while hearing the case to decriminalise homosexuality, opined that there was nothing unusual in holding a gay rally, something which is common outside India.

Days after the 2 July 2009 Delhi High Court verdict legalising homosexuality, Pink Pages, India's first online LGBT magazine was released. On 16 April 2009, India's first gay magazine Bombay Dost originally launched in 1990, was re-launched by Celina Jaitley in Mumbai.

On 27 June 2009, Bhubaneswar, the capital city of Odisha, saw its first gay pride parade. A day later, Union Law Minister Veerappa Moily announced that the Union Home Minister has convened a meeting with the Union Law Ministers, Union Health Ministers and Home Ministers of all states to evolve a consensus on decriminalising homosexuality in India. On 28 June 2009, Delhi and Bangalore held their second gay pride parades, and Chennai, generally considered to be a very conservative city, held its first.

Mumbai has one of its own pride events, like Kashish Mumbai Queer Film Festival which was first held in 2010 from 22 to 25 April and in the next year 2011 from 25 to 29 May. It was the first queer film festival in India and is held in a mainstream multiplex theater which screens LGBT films from all over the world. It has been recognised by Interpride as a pride event in India.

Madurai celebrated city's first LGBTQ Rainbow festival on 29 July 2012, Anjali Gopalan inaugurated Alan Turing Rainbow festival and flagged off the Asia's first Gender queer pride parade as a part of Turing Rainbow festival organised by Srishti Madurai, a literary and resource circle for alternative gender and sexualities. It was established by Gopi Shankar a student of The American College in Madurai to eradicate social discrimination faced by the LGBT and Genderqueer community. The objective of the organisation in to highlight 20 different types of Genders.

On 1 May 2011, Kolkata Rainbow Pride Festival (KRPF) was formed to take the initiative of organising Pride Walk in Kolkata. Since then the initiative of Queer Pride Parade in Kolkata is being taken by KRPF. The 11th Kolkata Rainbow Pride Walk, held on 15 July 2012, was attended by more than 1500 people. Kolkata hosted South Asia's first pride walk in 1999.

Chandigarh held its first LGBT pride parade on 15 March 2013 and it has been held annually ever since.

The first LGBT pride parade in Gujarat state was held at Surat on 6 October 2013.

Rajasthan witnessed its first pride event on 1 March 2015, when a pride walk was held in Jaipur.

Awadh witnessed the first Awadh Pride parade in 2017.

In 2013, India was represented by Nolan Lewis, a model, at the Mr Gay World 2013 contest. He had trouble finding sponsors. Previously, India had been represented at the Mr Gay World by Zoltan Parag Bhaindarkar in the 2008. He did not return to India and reportedly sought asylum in the United States.

Sushant Divgikar, the winner of Mr Gay India 2014, was a contestant on the Bigg Boss reality show. On 26 July 2014, at Kochi the 5th All-Kerala Queer Pride Parade was held. It was organised by Queerala (a support group for the LGBT community) and Sahayathrika (a rights organisation for lesbian and bisexual women in Kerala).

In June 2016, a platform named Amour Queer Dating is launched in India, to help queer/LGBTIQ people find long term companions.

See also

 LGBT culture in India
 :Category:Indian LGBT people
 Hijra (South Asia)
 Kothi (gender)

Organisations
 Trikone

Religious views

 LGBT topics and Hinduism
 LGBT themes in Hindu mythology
 Buddhism and sexual orientation
 Sikhism and sexual orientation
 Zoroastrianism and sexual orientation
 LGBT in Islam
 Christianity and homosexuality
 Homosexuality and the Bahá'í Faith

Media

 The World of Homosexuals by Shakuntala Devi the "Human Computer", 1977
 Pink Pages, India's National LGBT magazine
 Gaylaxy
 Fire

Related

 Catamite
 Greek love
 History of erotic depictions
 History of human sexuality
 History of homosexuality
 Homosexuality in ancient Greece
 Homosexuality in ancient Rome
 Homosexuality in China
 Homosexuality in Japan
 Human rights in India
 Kagema
 Male sexuality
 Pederasty in ancient Greece
 Sexuality in India
 Wakashū

References

References

Paola Bacchetta.  "Queer Formations in (Hindu) Nationalism." In Sexuality Studies, edited by Sanjay Srivasta, 121–140. Oxford, U.K.: Oxford University Press, 2013.

Further reading

Books
 (First edition)

 (Second edition)

Articles

Judgements

External links
 Gay Bombay Website

Sex laws in India
LGBT in India
Sexuality in India
Homosexuality in India